Opel Wien GmbH (formerly GM Powertrain Austria GmbH) is an Austrian manufacturing company based in Vienna / Aspern, Austria and was  a subsidiary of General Motors. Currently a subsidiary of the Dutch-based multinational automotive manufacturer Stellantis since 16 January 2021.

History 
The Austrian Chancellor Dr. Bruno Kreisky and GM Austria Chairman Helmuth Schimpf signed a contract to build an engine plant in Vienna/Aspern on  August 23, 1979. The investment amounted to over 9,8 billion Schilling.

Products
Opel Wien GmbH produces Family 0 engines, 5 and 6-Speed transmissions for Opel/Vauxhall and Chevrolet/Buick.

See also
List of GM engines
List of GM transmissions
Opel Eisenach
IBC Vehicles

References

External links

Opel Wien official corporate website (German)

Opel factories
Manufacturing companies based in Vienna